Diceratobasis macrogaster is a species of damselfly in the family Coenagrionidae endemic to Jamaica.  Its natural habitat is subtropical or tropical moist lowland forests. It is threatened by habitat loss.

Unlike most damselflies, the larvae of D. macrogaster live in pools which form in the leaves of bromeliads.

References

Fauna of Jamaica
Coenagrionidae
Insects described in 1857
Taxonomy articles created by Polbot